Music Written for Monterey 1965 (subtitled Not Heard... Played in its Entirety, at UCLA) is a live album by the American bassist, composer and bandleader Charles Mingus, recorded at Royce Hall in Los Angeles and released on Mingus's own Jazz Workshop label in 1966. The album was rereleased by Sue Mingus on the Sunnyside label in 2006.

Reception
AllMusic's Jeff Tamarkin wrote that "as an adjunct to Mingus' lengthy discography, it's a fascinating and sometimes brilliant entry". Samuel Chell of All About Jazz stated that "this recording of the enigmatic, volatile composer's UCLA performance could be regarded as an indispensable 'document,' filling in another piece of the puzzle that was Charles Mingus while providing privileged insights into the creative process as well as the private, elusive domain known as the 'self.

Track listing
All compositions by Charles Mingus except as indicated

Disc One:
 Opening Speech – 0:42       
 "Meditation on Inner Peace Part I" – 17:57     
 Speech Introducing Musicians – 1:41       
 "Meditation on Inner Peace Part II" – 0:51     
 Speech – 0:15     
 "Once Upon a Time There Was a Holding Corporation Called Old America" – 0:08     
 Lecture to Band – 0:27     
 "Once Upon a Time, There Was a Holding Corporation Called Old America" –1:22     
 "Ode to Bird and Dizzy" [aka "Bird Preamble"] (Charlie Parker, Dizzy Gillespie, Denzil Best, Fats Navarro, Max Roach, Oscar Pettiford, Tadd Dameron, Lonnie Hillyer, Charles McPherson, Danny Richmond) – 10:18     
 Speech: Call Octet Back – 0:54     
 "They Trespass the Land of Sacred Sioux" – 7:11     
Disc Two:
 Speech: Introduction to Hobart Dotson/"The Arts of Tatum and Freddy Webster" – 10:01     
 Speech – 1:24     
 "Once Upon a Time, There Was a Holding Corporation Called Old America" – 11:01     
 Speech: Introduction to Lonnie Hillyer – 0:35     
 "Twelfth Street Rag" (misidentified on album as Muskrat Ramble (Kid Ory, Ray Gilbert) – 3:11     
 Pause – 0:11     
 "Don't Be Afraid, The Clown's Afraid Too" – 8:21     
 "Don't Let It Happen Here" – 10:53

Personnel
Charles Mingus – bass, piano, narration
Hobart Dotson, Lonnie Hillyer – trumpet
Jimmy Owens – trumpet, flugelhorn
Julius Watkins – French horn
Howard Johnson – tuba
Charles McPherson – alto saxophone
Dannie Richmond – drums

References

1965 live albums
Charles Mingus live albums
Sunnyside Records live albums